Dolarbazar Union is a Union Parishad under Chhatak Upazila of Sunamganj District in the division of Sylhet, Bangladesh. It has an area of 24.7 square kilometres and a population of 32,150.

History 
Suf saint Ahsan Shah came to this area and is now buried in Moinpur.

The 20th century was an important part for Dolarbazar's development. In 1903, its first government primary school opened in Moinpur. In 1940, the Moinpur Eidgah was established. A decade later, the Golal Ratiya graveyard was created serving the local community. In 1994, the Janata Degree College opened in Moinpur. The union council office building was established on 7 January 2006.

Geography 
Dolarbazar Union is located in the Chhatak Upazila. It borders Chhaila Afjalabad Union in the east, Singchapair Union in the west, North Khurma Union and Gobindganj Syedergaon in the north and Jagannathpur Upazila in the south. It has an area of 24.7 square kilometres.

Demography 
Dolarbazar has a population of 32,150.

Administration 
Dolarbazar constitutes the no. 10 union council of Chhatak Upazila. It contains 51 villages and 28 mouzas.

Villages 
The villages are divided into 9 wards, each with a representative. They are as follows:
 Ward 1 (Giash Uddin Moinpuri): Amajastipur, Kursi, Chowkh Isabpur, Chankhar Bagoin, Chhaila, Durgapur, Moinpur, Shashon
 Ward 2 (Tajud Miah Katasholi): Katashola, Rauli
 Ward 3 (Shafiq Miah Southern Kursi): North Kursi, South Kursi
 Ward 4 (Abul Khayr Jahedpuri): Chanpur, Chelarchor, Jahedpur, Sherpur
 Ward 5 (Fayzur Rahman Muhammadpuri): Alampur, Chowkh Krishnapur, Khaghata, Gopinathpur, Chichhorauli, Talebpur, Doshpaika, Bubrajan, Buraiya, Bhaowa, Muhammadpur, Rampur
 Ward 6 (Salik Miah Chowdhury Eastern Boshontopuri): Gobindpur, Talupat, Dilalpur, Narsinghpur, Boshontopur, Jugolnogor, Srikrishnapur
 Ward 7 (Arif Ahmad Zamir Barogopi): Kollanpur, Barogopi
 Ward 8 (Hafiz Abdul Jalil Palpuri): Ekakamai, Gopalpur, Joti, Janaiya, Jomshorpur, Palpur, Lakshmipasha, Sulaymanpur
 Ward 9 (Abdul Hashim Mukhtarpuri): Nomshapur, Bademuktarpur, Bahubali, Muktarpur, Rampur

List of chairmen

Economy and tourism 
Dolarbazar has a significant number of British and American immigrants contributing to its economy. It has eight Haat bazaars. They are as follows:
 Moinpur Bazar
 Dolar Bazar
 Kursi Bazar
 Alampur Bazar
 Jahedpur Old Bazar
 Jahedpur New Bazar
 Buraiya Bazar
 Palpur Point

Education 
The Union has a literacy rate of 35%. It has 18 primary schools and 3 high schools. There are six madrasas (including one Kamil madrasa).

Language and culture 
The native population converse in their native Sylheti dialect but can also converse in Standard Bengali. Languages such as Arabic and English are also taught in schools. The Union contains 51 mosques and 9 eidgahs. They are as follows:
 Moinpur Central Jame Masjid and Eidgah
 Katashola Jame Masjid
 Rauli Jame Masjid
 Kursi Jame Masjid
 Chelarchor Jame Masjid
 Jahedpur Jame Masjid
 Chanpur Jame Masjid
 Buraiya Jame Masjid
 Khaghata Jame Masjid
 Jugolnogor Jame Masjid
 Dolarbazar Jame Masjid
 Kollanpur Jame Masjid
 Palpur Jame Masjid
 Muktarpur Jame Masjid
 Rampur Jame Masjid

Sports
Moinpur, Palpur, Jahedpur and Buraiya each have their own football clubs.

References

Unions of Chhatak Upazila
Sunamganj District